Taihe is a town under the administration of Hechuan District, Chongqing, China. , it administers the following three residential neighborhoods and 21 villages:
Neighborhoods
Sichouyuan Community
Mamenxi Community
Daheba Community

Villages
Taihe Village
Tangjia Village
Fuxing Village
Wangxian Village
Shiling Village
Fujin Village
Shajin Village
Shaijing Village
Baima Village
Loufang Village
Shiqiang Village
Basan Village
Baiyang Village
Shiya Village
Tingzi Village
Bao'en Village
Mulian Village
Xianqiao Village
Xiaohe Village
Lingjiao Village
Mishi Village

References 

Township-level divisions of Chongqing